William Granger is a  self-taught cook, restaurateur and food writer, based in his native Australia and in London but also working internationally.

Career
In the late 1980s, Granger relocated from Melbourne to Sydney to study art. He worked as a waiter while he studied art. His interest moved from art to food. In 1993, he opened a restaurant called Bills in the Sydney suburb of Darlinghurst. Breakfast, and, more specifically, creamy scrambled eggs, brought Granger to the public's attention. A second restaurant, Bills Surry Hills, opened in 1996. Bills Woollahra was his third restaurant.

In 2008, he opened the first Bills restaurant outside Australia in Japan, where he had lived for half a year. Since then, he has opened eight restaurants in Japan, in regions such as Tokyo, Yokohama, Kamakura, Fukuoka and Osaka.

In 2011, Granger opened his first UK restaurant, Granger & Co, in London's Westbourne Grove. In the spring of 2014, Granger opened a second London-based Granger & Co in Clerkenwell and a new Bills restaurant in Hawaii. In that same year, he also opened his first restaurant in Seoul, and now currently has two restaurants in the country.

Books
Granger wrote Bill's Sydney Food (Murdoch Books, 2000) which included information about the food in his restaurants. That book was followed by  Bill's Food (2002), Bill's Open Kitchen (2003), Simply Bill (2005), Bill Granger Every Day (2006), Holiday (2009), Bill's Basic's (2010), Bill's Everyday Asian (2011), Bill Granger Easy (2012), Bill's Italian Food (2014) and Australian Food (2020).

Media work
In 2004, the six part series, Bill's Food, followed Granger for a week. It was well received in Australia and subsequently screened on BBC2 in the United Kingdom in 2005, drawing an audience of 2 million. The series was repeated on BBC1 and was shown in 22 other countries. In June 2006, Granger appeared on GMTV to present a week-long barbecue special filmed in the South of France. A second series of Bill's Food was aired on various networks. In 2009 a seven part television series, Bill’s Holiday, was released featuring Granger’s travels exploring the varying regions and produce of Australia.

Granger is featured on a fortnightly segment on ABC Radio 702 with Richard Glover. Each week he discussed a recipe. He appeared cooking tasty 'Roast Dinner with Pancetta' on Wednesday, 16 February 2011.

In 2011, Bill Granger became The Independent on Sunday's weekly food columnist.

A ten-part television series bringing Granger's food to West London, Bill's Kitchen: Notting Hill, aired from June 2013 on BBC Lifestyle in Poland, South Africa, Asia, the Middle East, and the Nordic Region; on BBC HD in EMEA and LatAm; and on BBC Entertainment in Latin America.

Personal life
Granger was born to a vegetarian mother and a father who worked as a butcher. He and his wife Natalie Elliott have three daughters.

Bibliography
Sydney Food (Murdoch Books, 2000) 
Bills Food (Murdoch Books, 2002) 
Open Kitchen (Murdoch Books, 2003) 
Simply Bill (Murdoch Books, 2005) 
Everyday (Murdoch Books, 2006) 
Holiday (Murdoch Books, 2009) 
Feed Me Now (Quadrille, 2009) 
Bill's Basics (Quadrille, 2010) 
Bill's Everyday Asian (Quadrille, 2011) 
Bill Granger Easy (Collins, 2012) 
Australian Food (Murdoch Books, 2020)

References

External links
 
 Bill's Food on LifeStyle Food

Living people
1969 births
Australian television chefs
Cookbook writers
People educated at Mentone Grammar School
People from Melbourne